The Boston mayoral election of 1921 occurred on Tuesday, December 13, 1921. James Michael Curley, who had previously served as Mayor of Boston (1914–1918), was elected for the second time, defeating three other candidates.

In 1918, the Massachusetts state legislature had passed legislation making the Mayor of Boston ineligible to serve consecutive terms. Thus, incumbent Andrew James Peters was unable to run for re-election.

Due to the ratification of the Nineteenth Amendment in 1920, this was the first Boston municipal election that women could vote in.

Curley was inaugurated on Monday, February 6, 1922.

Candidates
 Charles S. Baxter, former Mayor of Medford from 1901 to 1904
 James Michael Curley, former member of the United States House of Representatives from 1913 to 1914, Mayor of Boston from 1914 to 1918
 John R. Murphy, former Commissioner of the Boston Fire Department
 Charles S. O'Connor, member of the Boston School Committee
Withdrew
 Joseph C. Pelletier, District Attorney of Suffolk County, Massachusetts

Results

See also
List of mayors of Boston, Massachusetts

References

Further reading
 
 

Boston mayoral
Boston
1921
Non-partisan elections
1920s in Boston